"Candy Shop" is a 2005 song by 50 Cent featuring Olivia.

Candy Shop may also refer to:

Confectionery store ("candy shop" in the United States), a store that sells candy
"Candy Shop" (Madonna song)
"Candy Shop", a song by Andrew Bird's Bowl of Fire from their 1999 album Oh! The Grandeur

See also
Candy Store (disambiguation)